Stanley Scrimshaw (7 August 1915 – 1988) was an English professional footballer who played for Hartlepool United and Bradford City. He was born in West Hartlepool.

References
Profile of Stan Scrimshaw
Rootsweb 

1915 births
1988 deaths
People from West Hartlepool
Footballers from Hartlepool
English footballers
Association football defenders
English Football League players
Hartlepool United F.C. players
Bradford City A.F.C. players
Huddersfield Town A.F.C. wartime guest players